Michael Breibert (born 11 January 1941) is an Austrian footballer. He played in two matches for the Austria national football team in 1966.

References

External links
 

1941 births
Living people
Austrian footballers
Austria international footballers
Place of birth missing (living people)
Association football defenders
FC Admira Wacker Mödling players
First Vienna FC players